Mohd Noh Alam Shah (born 3 September 1980) is a retired professional football player from Singapore who currently manages Tanjong Pagar United. Once regarded as one of the best forwards in South East Asia, Alam Shah was a member of the Singapore national football team when it won the AFF Championship in 2005 and 2007. 
At club level, he was a member of the Tampines Rovers team which won Singapore's S.League in 2004 and 2005.

Alam Shah is also well known for his volatile temper, which got him into trouble on a number of occasions. An incident of violent conduct when he knocked another player unconscious while playing for Tampines Rovers in the 2007 Singapore Cup final led to a 12-month ban from playing club-level football. The ban was later reduced to 7 months on appeal.

Alam Shah retired from football in 2015 and assisted to manage the Singapore national football teams from 2018 to 2020 before managing Tanjong Pagar United in 2020.

Club career

Tampines Rovers
After stints with Sembawang Rangers and the Singapore Armed Forces Football Club (SAFFC), Alam Shah joined Tampines Rovers in 2003. He helped the Stags win the S.League title in 2004 and 2005.

Alam Shah's good form earned him trials with Notts County in England and Skonto Riga in Latvia. However neither trial led to a deal due to work permit issues and language problems respectively.

In 2007, he scored a late goal against Liaoning Guangyuan to become the first player to score 100 goals for the club. The tally came from 88 goals in the league and 12 goals in the domestic cup competitions.

In the 2007 Singapore Cup final between Tampines Rovers and SAFFC, Alam Shah was sent off in the final minutes of the games after an incident involving his fellow national teammate Daniel Bennett. Alam Shah kneed Bennett in the head during a tussle for the ball and, after being dragged away by his teammates, he returned and kicked Bennett in the head. Bennett was knocked unconscious and had to be taken to hospital. Tampines lost the match 4–3. As a result of the incident, the Football Association of Singapore (FAS) Disciplinary Committee, banned Alam Shah from playing in all FAS-sanctioned domestic matches and tournaments for 12 months and fined him S$2,000.

Initially, it was thought that the ban would not prevent Alam Shah from playing at club-level outside Singapore, and he made arrangements to join PDRM FA of the Super League Malaysia. However, in January 2008, the Football Association of Malaysia confirmed that under FIFA rules, member associations are required to respect domestic bans imposed by other associations, and therefore Alam Shah would not be eligible to play club-level football in Malaysia until his ban was completed.

On 29 April 2008, Alam Shah appealed successfully to reduce his ban from 12 months to 7 months by the FAS's Disciplinary Committee. Although his was ban was almost halved, he still missed out the remaining three games of Singapore's World Cup 2010 qualifying campaign.

Alam Shah joined PDRM FA on loan upon completion of his ban in June 2008.

Alam Shah returned to Singapore to play for Tampines Rovers on 29 August 2008 in a S.League match against Gombak United. He scored his first goal after his ban, against Balestier Khalsa, on 11 September 2008.

He ended off his Tampines career with a hat-trick against the then Sengkang Punggol, including a twenty five-yard screamer in the last minute of regulation time.

Arema
Alam Shah joined Arema in 2009, citing poor attendances at S.League matches that led to poor motivation, and FAS's requirement of passing the fitness test before being allowed to play in a match. One of the reasons given for leaving S.League was that he felt he was given unfair treatment by referees.

On 11 May 2010, Alam Shah was sent off after an on-pitch incident with Persela Lamongan's defender F.X. Yanuar Wahyu. In the 70th minute, Alam Shah grabbed Yanuar and tried to wrestle him. Yanuar then spun around and knocked Alam Shah down. Both players were sent off. While leaving the pitch, Alam Shah lunged at the Persela players and had to be restrained by teammates and stewards. Arema won the match 2–1 and Alam Shah was subsequently banned for one match.

On 2 March 2011, Alam Shah scored a penalty for Arema against Japanese giants Cerezo Osaka in an AFC Champions League group match, thus becoming the first Singaporean footballer to score in the competition for a non-Singapore club.

On 15 June 2011, Alam Shah was offended by a remark from Miroslav Janů during a television interview before the match against Arema vs Persisam Putra Samarinda. Alam Shah did not play in the match and after his team returned, he took a golf club and fought with Janů. Assistant coach Tony Ho and the team players restrained both of them. Janů reasoned Alam Shah did not play in the last five games due to players from Singapore had never participated in the training, perhaps because Alam Shah had not received a salary.

On 5 February 2012, due to a salary dispute, Arema announced that the club had accepted Alam Shah's resignation.

Persib Bandung
After leaving Arema, Noh Alam Shah joined Persib Bandung. He made 19 appearances and scored 4 goals during his tenure at the club.

Return to Tampines Rovers
On 28 June 2012, it was confirmed that Alam Shah will return to defending champions Tampines Rovers FC, signing a 6 months contract with the club . He scored 5 goals in 14 games. However, after the conclusion of the season he choose not to renew his contract with the club and decided to try his luck playing at Indonesia again.

PSS Sleman
On 15 February 2013, in the morning it was confirmed that Alam Shah training in Maguwoharjo International Stadium, PSS Sleman home base. He will join ex teammate's in Arema IPL such as Budi Sudarsono, Waluyo, Aji Saka, Juan Revi, and Wahyu Gunawan.

Alam Shah recently scored on his League debut with the Indonesian First Division club PSS Sleman on Sunday, 28 April 2013, the match ended 2–0 with Alam Shah scoring both goals in the 32nd and 79th minute. However, during the course of the season, he suffered multiple injuries while playing for the team and hence was released by the club in late-October 2014 ending the season with just 2 goals in 11 games.

Tampines Rovers
He went back to Tampines Rovers in 2014 and scored 9 league goals in 29 games for the team.

On 10 August 2015, Alam Shah was accused by Brunei DPMM FC head coach Steve Kean of spitting on his face at the end of a tumultuous Singapore Cup clash between Tampines Rovers and the Bruneian side. The striker denied doing so.

On 21 November 2015, Alam Shah was sent off after an on-pitch incident with Harimau Muda goalkeeper, Ilham Amirullah at the last minute. It was the final match for the 2015 S.League season. After receiving a red card, he tried to attack one of the Harimau Muda defenders but was quickly held on by his teammates.

After his career in Tampines Rovers, Noh Alam Shah decided to retire after the 2015 season of S League.

International career
In a 2007 AFF Championship group stage match between Singapore and Laos, Alam Shah scored seven goals in an 11–0 win for Singapore. This seven-goal haul included a bicycle kick. This was the last bicycle kick to be scored at the old National Stadium. This was not only a record win for the Singapore national team, but also a record number of goals scored by an individual player in an 'A' international game for Singapore. Singapore went on to win the championship, and Alam Shah received the 'Most Valuable Player' award for his impressive displays in the tournament.

Alam Shah is also well remembered by Singapore fans for scoring a dramatic late equaliser against Kuwait in a World Cup qualifier in 2001, and for scoring in a 2–0 victory over Iraq during the AFC Asian Cup qualifiers in 2006.

Alam Shah wore the captain's armband in an international friendly against China PR (National Day Challenge) on 12 August 2009. Singapore drew 1–1 with China PR (losing 3–4 on penalties), with Alam Shah scoring in the 9th minute.

Noh Alam Shah's goals in 2010 came in two matches in the AFC Asian Cup 2011 qualification group stages. He scored in the 1–3 defeat to Iran at the National Stadium in Singapore and in the final group game against Jordan, which Singapore lost 1–2, at the King Abdullah Stadium in Amman.

Following the retirement of national skipper Indra Sahdan in 2010, Alam Shah's name has been going around as one of the favourites to take over Indra's reign as Singapore's captain, mainly due to his influential status within the Singapore camp, along with the passionate displays he has shown on international games.

However, he was later dropped from Raddy Avramovic's squad after disappointing performances at the 2010 AFF Championship.

Managerial career

National Team 
In 2017, Alam Shah was appointed as manager for the Singapore Selection team in The Sultan of Selangor's Cup. He was subsequently appointed as team mentor for the national football team for the 2018 AFF Suzuki Cup.

In 2018, Alam Shah was appointed as assistant manager to the Singapore national football team.

Tanjong Pagar United
After FAS announced that Tanjong Pagar United are rejoining Singapore Premier League for the 2020 season, the club announced that Noh Alam Shah was appointed as the team manager.

Personal life 
On 20 August 2015, Alam Shah was spotted driving for Grab.

After retirement from football, Alam Shah works as operations executive at the car rental department of Komoco Motors.

Honours

Club
Tampines Rovers
S.League (3): 2004, 2005, 2012
Singapore Cup (2): 2004, 2006

PDRM
Malaysia Premier League: 2007

Arema Indonesia
Indonesia Super League (1): 2009–10

PSS Sleman
Indonesian First Division (1): 2013

International
Singapore
AFF Championship (2): 2004, 2007

Individual
S.League Player of the Year: 2005
AFF Championship Most Valuable Player (1): 2007
AFF Championship top scorer (1): 2007
Former of AFF Championship overall top scorer with 17 goals
Ranked fourth in World's Top Goal Scorer by the International Federation of Football History & Statistics : 2007

National team career statistics

Goals for senior national team

References

External links
 Profile at Football Association of Singapore website
 Noh Alam Shah
 Closer With Noh Alam Shah: Unique Figure Captain Arema on Ongisnade.co.id
 Noh Alam Shah: Untold Stories Wonderwall And Model Toothpaste on Ongisnade.co.id
 Noh Alam Shah: A Goal on Match Debut, PSS Sleman Wins on divisiutama.co.id

1980 births
Living people
Singaporean footballers
Singapore international footballers
Tampines Rovers FC players
Expatriate footballers in Indonesia
Sembawang Rangers FC players
Liga 1 (Indonesia) players
Warriors FC players
Association football forwards
Singapore Premier League players
Arema F.C. players
PDRM FA players
Expatriate footballers in Malaysia
Persib Bandung players
PSS Sleman players
Singaporean expatriate footballers
Singaporean expatriate sportspeople in Malaysia
Singaporean expatriate sportspeople in Indonesia
Singaporean people of Malay descent